Plainsman or The Plainsman may refer to:

Films:
 The Plainsman, a 1936 Western film starring Gary Cooper and Jean Arthur
 The Plainsman (1966 film), a Technicolor remake of the 1936 film

Newspapers:
 Plainsman (South Africa), a local newspaper
 Plainsman (South Dakota), a newspaper in Huron, South Dakota, United States
 Kanto Plainsman, a United States Air Force newspaper out of Tachikawa Air Base, Tokyo, Japan, from 1961 to 1970
 The Auburn Plainsman, the student-run newspaper of Auburn University in Auburn, Alabama, United States

Vehicles:
 Chrysler Plainsman (1957–1959), the station wagon version of the Australian Chrysler Royal automobile
 Beechcraft Plainsman, a car made in 1946 by the Beech Aircraft Company

Other uses:
 The Plainsman Museum, Aurora, Nebraska, United States
 The Plainsman, a comic book mutant, part of Team Tejas

Lists of newspapers